Susan Florence Anspach (November 23, 1942 – April 2, 2018) was an American stage, film and television actress who had roles in films during the 1970s and 1980s such as Five Easy Pieces (1970), Play It Again, Sam (1972), Blume in Love (1973), Montenegro (1981), Blue Monkey (1987), and Blood Red (1989).

Early life
Anspach was born and raised in Queens, New York City. Her mother was Gertrude, a secretary and singer. Her father was Renald Anspach, a World War II Army veteran and later factory worker, who was of German-Jewish and English descent. The couple met at the 1939 New York World's Fair. Anspach's grandfather had disapproved of the marriage and disowned his daughter. Anspach was raised by her great aunt until Anspach was six, when her aunt died. She went back to live with her parents in what grew to be an abusive home; she left at age 15. With the help of a Roman Catholic organization, she moved in with a family in Harlem.

Anspach graduated from William Cullen Bryant High School in Long Island City in 1960. She received a full scholarship to the Catholic University of America in Washington, DC. She studied music and drama. Anspach made her professional debut in Thornton Wilder's one-act play Pullman Car Hiawatha at a summer theater in Maryland. After college, she moved back to New York City.

Career
Anspach starred in several Broadway and off-Broadway shows, including as the female lead (Sheila) in the musical Hair. The musical ran for 45 performances at the Cheetah Theatre. She was in a play with Al Pacino while at the Actors Studio. Anspach first came to prominence in the 1970 film Five Easy Pieces, directed by Bob Rafelson and starring Jack Nicholson. Vincent Canby of The New York Times called her "one of America's most charming and talented actresses". She followed this with a supporting role in Woody Allen's Play It Again, Sam (1972) and a more prominent role in Paul Mazursky's romantic comedy Blume in Love (1973), alongside George Segal and Kris Kristofferson.

Anspach originally was cast in the role of country singer Barbara Jean in the 1975 film Nashville, but her salary request exceeded the ensemble film's budget; she was replaced by Ronee Blakley.

She starred off-Broadway in 1965 in A View from the Bridge with Robert Duvall, Jon Voight, and Dustin Hoffman.

In her film career, Anspach starred in 19 features and eight television movies and also was featured in two series, The Yellow Rose and The Slap Maxwell Story (with Dabney Coleman). She guest-starred in the NBC romantic anthology series Love Story in 1973, in the episode "All My Tomorrows".

Personal life
Anspach was Roman Catholic. She said that the church and her psychoanalyst were her "parents" for close to 10 years of her youth.

Anspach had a daughter, Catherine Curry (born October 15, 1968) with fellow Hair cast member Steve Curry.   She had a son, Caleb Goddard (born September 26, 1970), whom she claimed was fathered by actor Jack Nicholson. She married actor Mark Goddard in June 1970 and divorced him in October 1978. Goddard adopted both children. Anspach married musician Sherwood Ball  (son of musician-entrepreneur Ernie Ball) in 1982 and divorced him in 1988.

Activism
Anspach marched with United Farm Workers head Cesar Chavez. She protested against the racist apartheid system of South Africa. Anspach also advocated for human rights in Central America.

Death
Anspach died from heart failure on April 2, 2018, aged 75, in her Los Angeles home.

Filmography

Film

Television

References

Citations

Sources

External links

Susan Anspach at the University of Wisconsin's Actors Studio audio collection

 Susan Anspach(Aveleyman)

1942 births
2018 deaths
20th-century American actresses
21st-century American actresses
Actresses from New York City
American film actresses
American people of German-Jewish descent
American stage actresses
American television actresses
Catholic University of America alumni
Catholics from New York (state)
People from Queens, New York
People from Harlem
William Cullen Bryant High School alumni
Deaths from congestive heart failure